This article lists the squads for the 2018 Tournament of Nations, the 2nd edition of the Tournament of Nations. The cup consisted of a series of friendly games, and was held in the United States from 26 July to 2 August 2018. The four national teams involved in the tournament registered a squad of 23 players.

The age listed for each player is on 26 July 2018, the first day of the tournament. The club listed is the club for which the player last played a competitive match prior to the tournament. The nationality for each club reflects the national association (not the league) to which the club is affiliated. A flag is included for coaches that are of a different nationality than their own national team.

Squads

Australia
Coach: Alen Stajcic

The final squad was announced on 17 July 2018. A day later, teenage bolter Mary Fowler was added to the squad. On 24 July 2018, Steph Catley withdrew from the squad due to family reasons and was replaced by Laura Alleway.

Brazil
Coach: Vadão

The final squad was announced on 21 July 2018.

Japan
Coach: Asako Takakura

The final squad was announced on 13 July 2018. On 23 July 2018, Rumi Utsugi, Nana Ichise, and Hikaru Naomoto withdrew from the squad due to injuries and were replaced with Mayo Doko and Hina Sugita.

United States
Coach: Jill Ellis

The final squad was announced on 23 July 2018.

Player representation

By club
Clubs with 3 or more players represented are listed.

By club nationality

By club federation

By representatives of domestic league

References

2018
2018 in American women's soccer
2018 in women's association football
July 2018 sports events in the United States